Jay Scott Drake (born July 5, 1969 in Santa Maria, California) is an American auto racing driver.

Racing career
Drake won the 1998 Turkey Night Grand Prix midget car race. Drake was the USAC National Sprint Car Champion in 2004. He also competed in 14 Indy Pro Series races in 2004 and 2005 with a best finish of third and finishing 9th in the 2005 point standings. Jay is currently the team manager for Keith Kunz Motorsports USAC Midget Team.

Awards
2004 USAC National Sprint Car Series Champion
2001 Chili Bowl winner 
2000 Indiana Sprintweek Champion
1997 USAC National Midget Series "Most Improved Driver"
1996 Western States Midget Series Champion
1993 Western States Midget Series "Rookie of the Year"
1991 USAC TQ Midget Champion
1990 USAC TQ Midget Champion
1990 USAC TQ Midget "Rookie of the Year"

Racing record

American open-wheel racing
(key) (Races in bold indicate pole position)

Indy Lights

External links
Driver Database Profile

1969 births
Living people
Indy Lights drivers
Sportspeople from Santa Maria, California
Racing drivers from California
World of Outlaws drivers
USAC Silver Crown Series drivers

Vision Racing drivers
AFS Racing drivers